Embley School (formerly Hampshire Collegiate School) is an independent day and boarding school for both girls and boys aged 2 to 18 located in Embley Park in Wellow (near Romsey), Hampshire, England.

History

In 1946, Embley Park (the former family home of Florence Nightingale) became a boarding school for boys between the ages of 11 and 18. In 1996, the school joined with an all-girls school based in Romsey, formerly known as La Sagesse Convent. It then consisted of a junior school (ages 3–11), a senior school (ages 11–16), and a sixth-form college (ages 16–18).

In 2006, the school underwent another merger with The Atherley School, and was renamed Hampshire Collegiate School, part of the United Church Schools Trust. An investment of £14 million expanded the senior school, and created a brand new junior school. In 2019, the school was renamed Embley.

References

Educational institutions established in 1946
Private schools in Hampshire
1946 establishments in England
Member schools of the Independent Schools Association (UK)
Boarding schools in Hampshire
United Learning schools
Church of England private schools in the Diocese of Winchester